The 1994 Regal Welsh Open was a professional ranking snooker tournament that took place between 30 January–5 February 1994 at the Newport Leisure Centre in Newport, Wales.

Ken Doherty was the defending champion, but lost in the third round to David Roe.

Steve Davis defeated Alan McManus 9–6 in the final to win his first Welsh Open title.


Main draw

References

Welsh Open (snooker)
1994 in snooker
1990s in Cardiff
Welsh